Hendrik (or Henderick) Joosten (or Joostzoon) Speuy (c.1575 – 1 October 1625) was a Dutch renaissance organist and composer, and a contemporary of Jan Pieterszoon Sweelinck.

Speuy was born at Brielle.  From 1595 he was organist of the Grote Kerk and Augustijnen Kerk in Dordrecht. In 1610 he composed De Psalmen Davids, a book of bicinia for the Genevan Psalter which he dedicated to the British monarch James I, and the first published work in the Netherlands for a keyboard instrument. He died in Dordrecht.

References
 W. Apel, The History of Keyboard Music to 1700, Indiana University Press, Bloomington & Indianapolis, 1967, pp. 338–339

External links
 Short biography

1575 births
1625 deaths
Dutch Baroque composers
Composers for pipe organ
Renaissance composers
Dutch classical organists
Organists and composers in the North German tradition
German male organists
People from Brielle
People from Dordrecht
17th-century classical composers
Dutch male classical composers
Dutch classical composers
17th-century male musicians
Male classical organists